Liz Harmer is a Canadian writer, whose debut novel The Amateurs was shortlisted for the Amazon.ca First Novel Award in 2019. The novel, written as her master's thesis while studying creative writing at the University of Toronto, was published by Knopf Canada in 2018.

Originally from Hamilton, Ontario, she is currently based in California.

She was also a shortlisted Journey Prize finalist in 2018 for her short story "Never Prosper".

References

External links

21st-century Canadian novelists
21st-century Canadian women writers
Canadian women novelists
St. Francis Xavier University alumni
Writers from Hamilton, Ontario
University of Toronto alumni
Living people
Year of birth missing (living people)